Hurricane Jimena was a strong tropical cyclone that brushed Hawaii in early September 2003. It was the tenth named storm and second hurricane of the 2003 Pacific hurricane season. Jimena formed on August 28 in the far Eastern Pacific Ocean as a tropical depression and moved westward where it rapidly became a hurricane the following day. The storm moved westward into the Central Pacific Ocean where it became a Category 2 hurricane on the Saffir–Simpson Hurricane Scale. After reaching its peak strength as a Category 2 hurricane, the storm began to weaken due to increasing wind shear. Jimena brushed past the Hawaiian Islands before becoming a tropical depression on September 3. The weakening storm then crossed the international dateline before dissipating on September 5, becoming one of the few storms to cross both 140ºW and International Date Line.

Jimena was the first Pacific hurricane to threaten Hawaii since Hurricane Daniel of the 2000 Pacific hurricane season. However, the storm weakened as it passed south of the islands and the effects from Jimena were minimal; there were no reported fatalities or injuries from the storm.

Meteorological history

An area of disturbed weather formed on August 26, 2003, and drifted westward. The disturbed weather then began to organize and the system became a tropical depression on August 28.

Jimena continued to intensify as it moved westward. Jimena then was upgraded to hurricane status later that day. At 1500 UTC, visible satellite imagery showed the storm having a small cloud filled eye and developing banding features south of the storm's center as Jimena continued to move west northwest. At 0600 UTC, the National Hurricane Center issued its last advisory on Jimena as the storm crossed into the Central Pacific Hurricane Center's area of responsibility.

On August 31, Jimena encountered strong southerly wind shear, causing it to quickly weaken back to a tropical storm by September 1. Jimena continued to weaken as wind shear increased and the storm weakened to a tropical depression on September 3. After weakening back to a depression, Jimena crossed the International Date Line on September 5 at 0600 UTC, where it became the first storm to exist in all three Pacific basins since 1999's Hurricane Dora. However, Jimena was only tracked briefly by the Joint Typhoon Warning Center, since strong wind shear resulted in the low level circulation to be exposed from the center and at 1727 UTC, the low level had nearly dissipated.

Preparations and impact

Forecasters at the Central Pacific Hurricane Center began issuing a Hurricane Watch for the Big Island of Hawaii on August 31 at 0000 UTC; the following day the Central Pacific Hurricane Center (CPHC) issued a tropical storm warning at 0300 UTC and a flash flood watch. The watches and warnings prompted residents to board up windows and stock up on emergency supplies. The storm's approach also closed down beaches and prompted officials to cancel outdoor activates as a precaution and the American Red Cross opened shelters and provided emergency services. The preparations for Hurricane Jimena cost the American Red Cross $5,000 (2003 USD).

As Jimena passed south of Hawaii as a weakening tropical storm, it brought high winds and heavy rainfall to the island. The storm dropped 6–10 inches of rain across the Big Island. In Glenwood, Hawaii, the storm dropped  of rain. The rainfall from Jimena helped reduce drought conditions across the Big Island.

High winds from Jimena knocked down trees and damaged power lines, leaving 1,300 residents without electricity. Heavy rainfall from the storm also caused minor flooding on the eastern side of the Big Island. Offshore, high surf and strong currents brought by the storm resulted in 350 swimmers being rescued by the United States Coast Guard, residents, and state and local police and fire departments. Overall there were no fatalities or injuries from Hurricane Jimena. The name Jimena was not retired by the World Meteorological Organization in the spring of 2004 and was used in the 2009 season.

See also

List of Hawaii hurricanes
Hurricane Genevieve (2014)

References

Jimena
Jimena (2003)
2003 natural disasters in the United States
Jimena
2003 in Hawaii
Jimena